The C64 Direct-to-TV, called C64DTV for short, is a single-chip implementation of the Commodore 64 computer, contained in a joystick (modeled after the mid-1980s Competition Pro joystick), with 30 built-in games. The design is similar to the Atari Classics 10-in-1 TV Game. The circuitry of the C64DTV was designed by Jeri Ellsworth, a computer chip designer who had previously designed the C-One.

Tulip Computers (which had acquired the Commodore brand name in 1997) licensed the rights to Ironstone Partners, which cooperated with DC Studios and Mammoth Toys in the development and marketing of the unit. Released in late 2004, QVC purchased the entire first production run of 250,000 units and sold 70,000 of them on the first day that they were offered.

Versions
There exist multiple versions of the C64DTV. DTV1 (NTSC television type) comes with 2 MB ROM. It first appeared in late 2004 for the American/Canadian market. DTV2 (called C64D2TV sometimes) is a revised version for the European and world markets (PAL television type) and appeared in late 2005. The ROM has been replaced by flash memory in these devices. However, the DTV2/PAL version suffers from a manufacturing fault, which results in poor colour rendering (the resistors in the R-2R ladder DACs for both the chroma and the luma have been transposed). In the DTV3, a problem with the blitter was fixed.

Hardware specifications

 Core circuitry
 ASIC running at 32 MHz internally, implementing 6510 CPU, VIC-II, SID, CIA, and PLA
 Casing/Connectors
 integrated in a joystick (as if connected to port 2 of a real C64)
 five additional buttons (acting like keys)
 running from batteries only (four AA batteries)
 Composite video, monaural audio (RCA connectors)
 looks similar to a Competition Pro joystick
 Graphics
 NTSC (DTV2 and later: NTSC/PAL on chip, only PAL wired in end-market devices)
 reprogrammable palette with 4 bits of luma and 4 bits of chroma
 DTV2 and later: "chunky" 256 color mode, additional blitter for fast image transformation
 Sound
 no support for SID filters
 DTV2 and later: 8 bit digital sound, additional options for envelope generators
 Memory
 DTV1: 128 KB RAM, 2 MB ROM
 DTV2 and later: 2 MB RAM, 2 MB flash memory
 DMA engine for RAM/RAM and ROM/RAM transfers
 DTV2 and later: additional RAM access using bank switching and blitter
 CPU
 implementing a 6510 at 1 MHz
 DTV2 and later: Enhanced CPU (fast/burst mode, additional registers and opcodes, support for illegal ops of the 6510)

Built-in games

The official games for the unit are mostly a mix of Epyx and Hewson C64 games. Games unique to the NTSC or PAL versions are noted below.

Hardware-modding
Since the internal circuit board has exposed solder points for floppy-drive and keyboard ports, hardware modifications of the C64DTV are relatively simple.

Known hardware mods
 Keyboard connector
 External joystick (Port 1 and 2)
 Floppy connector
 Power unit connector
 Fixing the palette problems of the PAL version (to some degree this is possible in software by adjusting palette entries)
 S-Video connector
 User port
 Original C64 casing and PS2 keyboard 
Additional hardware
 Data transfer cable (Parallel port (or USB/serial port via DTV2ser) to Joystick or user port)
 SD card interface 1541-III or MMC2IEC

Limitations
The internal flash memory is accessible as device 1. However, software is not included to support write operations so high-score saving is not possible. Also, flash devices used in the DTV are specified for a very limited number of write accesses only.

When using the standard keyboard mod, the F7 key does not work. There is a workaround, the "Keyboard Twister."

Software-modding
The DTV contains software-flashable memory. A number of tools have been released to compile programs into DTV-compatible flash images and load it onto the DTV. People made their own game compilations, adding popular (sometimes DTV-fixed) games that were not in the original DTV, added boot menus to make homebrew software development easier or enable new features, for example transfer programs like DTVtrans for transferring data from PC to DTV RAM and vice versa via the PC parallel port (or USB) and the DTV joystick port.

References

External links
  - DTV versions overview, HOWTOs, DTV Programming guide
 The Official C64 DTV site - user manual plus some other information
 David Murray's Commodore DTV Hacking
 C64DTV stuff by tlr Flash Tool, ML-Monitor, PC<->DTV transfer system
  Mr. Latch-up's C64 DTV & Hummer Advice Column
 A page about the history of the device
 Details on fixing colour problem on PAL DTVs - Note that surface-mount soldering skills are required.
 DTVtrans, connecting a DTV to a PC via parallel port
 DTV2ser, connecting a DTV to a PC/Mac via USB or serial port
 Four ways to turn a C64 DTV into a C64 clone
 Grokk´s DTV Stuff DTVBIOS and DTVBASIC - make your DTV code-ready.
 dtvhacking.retrosafe.com
 http://dtvhacking.cbm8bit.com/v1/index.html
 https://www.gamesindustry.biz/articles/the-commodore-64-bounces-back-to-life-as-a-direct-to-tv-plug-and-play-joystick
 C64 DTV Games Joystick Specs and History

Dedicated consoles
Home computer remakes
Handheld TV games
Commodore 64